Mount Eden Prisons consists of two separate facilities in the Auckland, New Zealand suburb of Mount Eden — the Mount Eden Prison and the Mount Eden Corrections Facility.

History 
The original Mount Eden prison was a military stockade built in 1856. It became Auckland's main prison when the old city jail on the corner of Queen and Victoria Streets was demolished in 1865. The stone wall and the foundations were completed in 1872, the building proper was commenced in 1882 and finished in 1917. 

Intended to house 220 prisoners, it was designed by Pierre Finch Martineau Burrows and resembles Dartmoor Prison in England. Its design consisted of wings radiating from the centre like the spokes of a wheel. This allowed for control from the centre and "a new mode of obtaining power of mind over mind", an application of the panopticon prison design theories of Jeremy Bentham. Early prisoners were used as labourers to quarry stone for use in road construction around Auckland, including the quarries at Maungawhau / Mount Eden and Auckland Grammar School., .. and is how the prison got the colloquial nick name of "Rock College" and there are tales of the early and/or longtime prisoners getting brick walls tattooed on their backs, a brick for each of the years incarcerated>.

The prison has a colourful history. Prisoners were executed there and it was the site of New Zealand's last execution, in 1957 when Walter James Bolton was hanged for poisoning his wife Beatrice. There were few escapes but a song was written about one famous escaper, George Wilder. In 1963, he escaped and was free for 172 days, during which time he travelled  and committed 40 crimes. Pat Boone's song 'Speedy Gonzales' was rewritten by the Howard Morrison Quartet and became "George The Wilder Colonial Boy".

There was a major riot on 20 and 21 July 1965. Prisoners rioted for 33 hours after a prison guard caught two prisoners trying to escape. New Zealand Special Air Service troopers and NZ Army Gunners were brought in to help quell the mayhem and reinforce NZ Corrections staff and NZ Police officers.
 Chaos ensued as prisoners burnt much of the prison, including the prison records. The riot was a sensational event for the pupils and staff of the two neighbouring boys' secondary schools, St Peter's College and Auckland Grammar School. The old prison has been given a "Category I" classification by Heritage New Zealand.

Privatisation 
In July 2000, the prison was kept in control of the Department of Corrections and a new building transferred to the control of Australasian Correctional Management Limited (later Global Expertise in Outsourcing NZ Ltd) and became New Zealand's first privately run prison. It was renamed the Auckland Central Remand Prison. However, the Labour Party was opposed to the privatisation of prisons, and in July 2005 put the prison back under the control of the Department of Corrections.

In June 2007 it was announced that a new six-storey prison building and a four-storey accommodation block would be built on the southern side of the building by 2011, adding 450 beds. The Auckland Central Remand Facility was then amalgamated into a new Mt Eden Corrections Facility. The plan was for the old prison to be converted to administrative space, in accordance with its heritage classification. To date it has not happened and lays dormant.

The redevelopment included a secure gatehouse, a visitor centre and a multilevel carpark added to the structure. Tunnels link the different sections. The barbed wire around the complex disappeared and was replaced by high and secure walls. Vocal opponents included the former Mayor of Auckland, John Banks.

In May 2010, the National-led government decided that contract management would again be implemented at Auckland Central Remand Prison. The contract was awarded to Serco, a British company that runs prisons in several different countries.

On 16 July 2015, footage of "fight clubs" within the prison emerged online and was reported by TVNZ. Serco was heavily criticized for not investigating until after the footage was screened. On 24 July, Serco's contract to run the Mount Eden prison was revoked and operation was given back to the New Zealand Department of Corrections. Serco was ordered to pay $8 million to the New Zealand government as a result of problems at Mount Eden Prison while it was under Serco's management.

Notable inmates
Roy Courlander, British-Nazi collaborator
Robert Wallath (1874–1960), highwayman from New Plymouth
George Wilder
Juliet Hulme (a.k.a. Anne Perry), convicted for the murder of Honorah Parker in the Parker-Hulme murder case
Kim Dotcom (born Kim Schmitz), founder of now-defunct file hosting service Megaupload, and another cloud storage service called Mega
Christopher John Lewis, who attempted to assassinate Queen Elizabeth II in 1981.
Walter James Bolton, executed in 1957 for murdering his wife, and the last man to be hanged in New Zealand.
Edward Te Whiu, executed in 1955 for murdering an elderly woman during a robbery.
William Alfred Bayly, executed in 1934 for murdering two of his neighbors.

Notable staff

See also
Auckland Prison (Paremoremo)

References

External links
 Mt Eden Prison
 Auckland Central Remand Prison
 Photographs of Mount Eden Prison held in Auckland Libraries' heritage collections.

Buildings and structures in Auckland
Prisons in New Zealand
Heritage New Zealand Category 1 historic places in the Auckland Region
1910s architecture in New Zealand